Alcida and Dauversière is an area with enhanced services within the Canadian local service district of the parish of Beresford in Gloucester County, New Brunswick; it is often erroneously cited as a local service district in its own right. There are about 100 inhabitants; the place is well known for its beautiful Antinouri Lake. The church is now destroyed and the community centre is being restored.

History

Notable people

See also
List of communities in New Brunswick

References

Communities in Gloucester County, New Brunswick
Local service districts of Gloucester County, New Brunswick